Karunakara Guru (1 September 1927 – 6 May 1999), also known as Navajyothisree Karunakara Guru, was an Indian Guru, and founder of Santhigiri Ashram in Pothencode, Kerala, India.

Birth and childhood
Navajyothisree Karunakara Guru was born on 1 September 1927 to the Chittekattu family in Chandiroor village in Kerala, India. As a child, he is said to have maintained simplicity,cleanliness and a regular prayer routine, and wanted to lead a monastic life.

Establishment of Santhigiri
Around the age of 14, Navajyothisree Karunakara Guru left his family home and joined Advaita Ashram in Alwaye, a branch of Sivagiri Mutt, founded by Naryana Guru, and spent the next 17 years at the various branches of Sivagiri Mutt.

In 1957, Karunakara Guru left Sivagiri and moved to a hut on a nearby hill. With the help of Khureshia Fakir, a Sufi saint, Karunakara Guru experienced several visionary experiences. In 1968, Karunakara Guru founded Santhigiri Ashram. After five years of meditation, prayers, and physical hardships, Karunakara Guru attained 'spiritual completion' in 1973. Following this, Karunakara Guru instructed his followers to adopt a worship system based on faith in one Universal God – the Brahman. The Santhigiri Ashram was advertised as open to all. Karunakara Guru would spend hours talking to people on spiritual matters. Many people visited him to receive guidance with personal and family-related problems. Guru’s devotees believe he was, and still is, after he left his body, the path to true knowledge and spiritual evolution. Karunakara Guru died on 6 May 1999.

Santhigiri Ashram
The Santhigiri Ashram is located at Pothencode in  Thiruvananthapuram, the capital city of Kerala.

References

External links
Official Site of Santhigiri Ashram
From deep Rajasthan, a lapidary gem
'Lotus of peace' blooms in Santhigiri Ashram
Building a monument of peace
Prime Minister's Speech
Prime Minister inaugurates Santhigiri Ashram's Research Centre
Guru's ideology

Malayali people
Indian Hindu spiritual teachers
People from Alappuzha district
1927 births
1999 deaths
20th-century Hindu religious leaders
Malayali Hindu saints